Le Défi Plus is a Mauritian weekly newspaper.  It was founded in 1996.

References

Newspapers published in Mauritius
1996 establishments in Mauritius
Publications established in 1996